The Jewish Anti-Fascist Committee, abbreviated as JAC, was an organization that was created in the Soviet Union during World War II to influence international public opinion and organize political and material support for the Soviet fight against Nazi Germany, particularly from the West. It was organized by the Jewish Bund leaders Henryk Erlich and Victor Alter, upon an initiative of Soviet authorities, in fall 1941; both were released from prison in connection with their participation. Following their re-arrest, in December 1941, the Committee was reformed on Joseph Stalin's order in Kuibyshev in April 1942 with the official support of the Soviet authorities. In 1952, as part of the persecution of Jews in the last year part of Stalin's rule (for example, the "Doctors' plot"), most prominent members of the JAC were arrested on trumped-up spying charges, tortured, tried in secret proceedings, and executed in the basement of Lubyanka Prison. Stalin and elements of the KGB were worried about their influence and connections with the West. They were officially rehabilitated in 1988.

Activities

Solomon Mikhoels, the popular actor and director of the Moscow State Jewish Theatre, was appointed the JAC chairman. The JAC's newspaper in Yiddish was called Eynigkayt ( "Unity", Cyrillic: Эйникейт).

The JAC broadcast pro-Soviet propaganda to foreign audiences, assuring them of the absence of antisemitism in the Soviet Union. In 1943, Mikhoels and Itzik Feffer, the first official representatives of the Soviet Jewry allowed to visit the West, embarked on a seven-month tour to the United States, Mexico, Canada and the United Kingdom to increase their support for the Lend-Lease. In the US, they were welcomed by a National Reception Committee chaired by Albert Einstein and by B.Z. Goldberg, Sholem Aleichem's son-in-law, and American Jewish Joint Distribution Committee. The largest pro-Soviet rally ever in the United States was held on July 8 at the Polo Grounds, where 50,000 people listened to Mikhoels, Feffer, Fiorello H. La Guardia, Sholem Asch, and Chairman of World Jewish Congress Rabbi Stephen Samuel Wise. Among others, they met Chaim Weizmann, Charlie Chaplin, Marc Chagall, Paul Robeson and Lion Feuchtwanger.

In addition to the funds for the Soviet war effort – US$16 million raised in the US, $15 million in England, $1 million in Mexico, $750,000 in Mandatory Palestine – other help was also contributed: machinery, medical equipment, medicine, ambulances, clothes. On July 16, 1943, Pravda reported: "Mikhoels and Feffer received a message from Chicago that a special conference of the Joint initiated a campaign to finance a thousand ambulances for the needs of the Red Army." The visit drew the attention of the American public to the necessity of entering the European war.

Persecution

Towards the end and immediately after the war, the JAC became involved in documenting the Holocaust. This ran contrary to the official Soviet policy to present it as atrocities against all Soviet citizens, not acknowledging the specific genocide of the Jews.

Committee members had international contacts especially in the US at the outset of the Cold War and this may have contributed to them later being accused of treason and espionage.

The contacts with American Jewish organizations resulted in the plan to publish The Black Book of Soviet Jewry simultaneously in the US and the Soviet Union, documenting the Holocaust and participation of Jews in the resistance movement. The Black Book was indeed published in New York City in 1946, but no Russian edition appeared. The typeface galleys were broken up in 1948, when the political situation of Soviet Jewry  deteriorated.

In January 1948, Mikhoels was killed in Minsk by Ministry of State Security agents who staged the murder as a car accident. The members of the Jewish Anti-Fascist Committee were arrested. They were charged with disloyalty, bourgeois nationalism, cosmopolitanism, and planning to establish Jewish autonomy in Crimea to serve US interests.

In January 1949, the Soviet mass media launched a massive propaganda campaign against "rootless cosmopolitans", unmistakably aimed at Jews. Markish observed at the time: "Hitler wanted to destroy us physically, Stalin wants to do it spiritually." On 12 August 1952, at least thirteen prominent Yiddish writers were executed in the event known as the "Night of the Murdered Poets" ("Ночь казненных поэтов").

List of notable JAC members
The size of JAC fluctuated with time. According to Aleksandr Solzhenitsyn (200 Years Together), it grew to have about 70 members.

Solomon Mikhoels (Chairman), the actor-director of the Moscow State Jewish Theater
Solomon Lozovsky (Secretary), a former Soviet vice-minister of Foreign Affairs and the head of the Soviet Information Bureau
Shakne Epshtein (Secretary and editor of the Eynikeyt newspaper)
Itzik Feffer, a poet
Ilya Ehrenburg, a writer
Eli Falkovich, a writer
Solomon Bregman, a deputy minister of State Control
Aaron Katz, a Red Army general of the Stalin Military Academy
Boris Shimeliovich, the Chief Surgeon of the Red Army and director of Botkin Hospital 
Joseph Yuzefovich, a historian
Leib Kvitko, a poet
Peretz Markish, a poet
Isaak Nusinov, a linguist and literature critic
David Bergelson, a writer 
David Hofstein, a poet
Benjamin Zuskin, an actor
Ilya Vatenberg, an editor
Shlomo Shleifer, Chief Rabbi of Moscow
Emilia Teumin, an editor
Leon Talmy, a journalist, translator
Khayke Vatenberg-Ostrowskaya, a translator
Lina Stern, a biochemist, physiologist and humanist and the  first female full member of the Russian Academy of Sciences
Israel Fisanovich, submarine commander, Hero of the Soviet Union
 Shmuel Halkin, a poet

See also
All-Slavic Anti-Fascist Committee 
History of the Jews in Russia and Soviet Union
Yevsektsiya
Doctors' plot
History of anti-Semitism
Vasily Grossman
Polina Zhemchuzhina
Jewish Bolshevism
Jewish left

Notes

References

Further reading
  Stalin's Secret Pogrom: The Postwar Inquisition of the Jewish Anti-Fascist Committee (by Joshua Rubenstein)
The Black Book (Chornaya Kniga), compiled and edited by: Vasily Grossman and Ilya Erenburg

External links

Memorandum concerning the Jewish Antifascist Committee sent to Mikhail Suslov in June 1946 (Library of Congress archives)
JAC case (in Russian language) at International Democracy Fund Archives
Stalin's secret pogrom: Commies who became politically incorrect (By Chuck Morse)
Beyond the Pale: The history of Jews in Russia
Group photo of the members of the Jewish Anti-Fascist Committee
Stalin’s Bureaucracy in Action: The Creation and Destruction of the Jewish Anti-Fascist Committee Shimon Redlich, War, Holocaust and Stalinism: A Documented Study of the Jewish Anti-Fascist Committee in the USSR, Luxembourg: Harwood Academic Publishers, 1995. Reviewed by Theodore H. Friedgut
  JAC and its end
  JAC, Soviet repressions and its demise

1942 establishments in the Soviet Union
Anti-fascist organizations
Bundism in Europe
Jewish political organizations
Soviet state institutions
Jews and Judaism in the Soviet Union
Political repression in the Soviet Union
Organizations established in 1942
Jewish anti-fascists